Multiple pterygium syndrome is a cutaneous condition inherited in an autosomal dominant fashion.

Society 
Musician Patrick Henry Hughes has a type of this condition.

See also 
 Popliteal pterygium syndrome
 List of cutaneous conditions
 Datagenno - Escobar Syndrome

References

External links 

Genodermatoses
Rare syndromes